Ann Arbor–Detroit Regional Rail (also known as MiTrain and formerly known as SEMCOG Commuter Rail) is a planned regional rail link along the Michigan Line between the cities of Ann Arbor and Detroit, Michigan, a total length of .  The project would connect with a proposed Detroit bus rapid transit service and the QLine streetcar.

History 
Detroit previously had commuter rail service.  Until 1983, SEMTA operated Grand Trunk Western Railroad's former service between downtown Detroit, and Pontiac, Michigan. Amtrak continued Penn Central Detroit–Ann Arbor commuter service as the Michigan Executive until 1984.

In May 2009 SEMCOG commissioned a $200,000 study to determine whether commuter trains could operate along the same corridor as Amtrak intercity passenger trains and freight trains.  limited service for special events in Detroit was scheduled to begin in early 2013, while regular commuter service was scheduled for 2014, after further track upgrades are completed. However,  no operating funds had been identified and service was at least two years out.

From November 12 to 14, 2012, testing of the railcar fleet by an Amtrak GE Dash 8-32BWH locomotive took place between Pontiac and Jackson; while service will only initially operate between Ann Arbor and Detroit, testing the fleet on additional trackage eases the process required for future expansion to Jackson and Pontiac. The locomotives have not yet been tested.

The plan was folded into the RTA's master plan in May 2016. The service was estimated to cost $11-$19 million to operate annually, and $130 million in capital costs to start. At that time, it was thought that service could begin in 2022.

However as of November 2022, there has not been any updates on the project, and it is unknown if it was canceled or is still happening.

Service 
The service is proposed to operate eight round-trips during each day: three during morning and afternoon rush-hours, one during the midday, and one in the evening. An end-to-end ride is estimated to take 45 minutes, and there would be stops at Ann Arbor, Ypsilanti, Wayne, Dearborn and the New Center neighborhood in Detroit.  Of these stops, four are existing or proposed Amtrak stations, and one (Wayne) would be a new station used exclusively for the regional rail service.

Rolling stock 
SEMCOG Commuter Rail's rolling stock are all ex-Metra Budd bi-level gallery-type cars as the passenger cars and the locomotives are ex-GO Transit EMD F59PH units currently owned by RB Railway Leasing. SEMCOG has painted its rolling stock. Like on Metra cab cars, SEMCOG's cab cars have red and white warning stripes at the front. They have plates that say "MiTrain" on the sides.

See also 
WALLY (commuter rail)
Transportation in metropolitan Detroit
Southeast Michigan

Notes

References

External links 
RTA Projects Page
SEMCOG Ann Arbor - Detroit Regional Rail Project
One of the leased EMD F59PHs in late 2010

Passenger rail transportation in Michigan
Commuter rail in the United States
Proposed railway lines in the United States
Transportation in Detroit
Transportation in Ann Arbor, Michigan